The 2021–22 Swiss Women's Super League (referred to as the Axa Women's Super League for sponsoring reasons) is the 52nd season of top-tier competitive women's football in Switzerland.

Format
In the regular season, ten teams (eight teams from the previous season and two teams from the 2020-21 Nationalliga B) play a round-robin league, with home and away games, for a total of 18 games each. At the end of the first phase, the eight top teams advance to the playoffs. The bottom two teams are joined by the top two teams of the Nationalliga B in the relegation playoff. 

The winner of the playoffs is crowned Swiss Champion. The champion and the winner of the regular season qualify to the UEFA Champions League.

The top two teams of the Relegation Playoff are qualified for the 2022–23 Swiss Women's Super League, the bottom two are relegated to 2022-23 Nationalliga B.

Teams

Regular season

League table

Playoffs

Bracket

Results

Quarter-finals

Servette FC Chênois Féminin won 5–0 on aggregate.

FC Basel 1893 won 7–1 on aggregate.

Grasshopper Club Zürich won 8–5 on aggregate.

FC Zürich Frauen won 9–1 on aggregate.

Semi-finals

2–2 on aggregate. Servette FC Chênois Féminin won 4–3 on penalties.

FC Zürich Frauen won 4–0 on aggregate.

Final

Placement Games
Eliminated teams of the playoff quarter finals play placement games to determine placement between ranks 5-8.

FC Luzern won 8–2 on aggregate.

FC St. Gallen-Staad won 5–1 on aggregate.

Relegation playoff
As FC Lugano Femminile withdrew from the Axa Women's Super League and are relegated directly, only the 9th place team of the Women's Super League will play against the top two teams of the Nationalliga B. The three teams will play a round-robin playoff with home and away games. The first and second ranked teams will be promoted or remain in the AWSL, while the last placed will be relegated.

Table

References

External links
 Official Website

2021-22
Swiss
2021–22 in Swiss football